"Feels So Good" is the title of an instrumental composition by the American flugelhorn player Chuck Mangione. It was written and produced by Mangione, and is the title track from his 1977 album.

"Feels So Good" was released as a single in early 1978, which reached #4 on the Billboard Hot 100 chart in June of that year after spending a week atop the Billboard easy listening chart in May. The recording was also nominated for a Grammy Award for Record of the Year at the ceremony held in 1979, losing out to Billy Joel's "Just the Way You Are". Mangione re-recorded the tune (as a slow ballad, and with lyrics sung by Don Potter) for his 1982 album 70 Miles Young.

Mangione was quoted describing the editing of the original version of the track as "major surgery."

Chart performance

Weekly charts

Year-end charts

Personnel
 Chuck Mangione: Flugelhorn & electric piano
 Chris Vadala: Saxes
 Grant Geissman: Guitar
 Charles Meeks: Electric Bass
 James Bradley, Jr.: Drums

In popular culture
Mangione appeared in a commercial for Memorex in 1979 performing "Feels So Good". Ella Fitzgerald, who became famous for Memorex commercials in the 1970s, heard Mangione and musicians perform it, then it was played back for her. When she was asked "is it live or is it Memorex?", Ella shrugged and said, "beats me!"

The composition was heard frequently in King of the Hill, including a running gag in which Mangione (who often guest starred on the show as himself) worked it into whatever he was playing.

"Feels So Good" was heard in the 2016 Marvel Studios film Doctor Strange in a scene where Dr. Stephen Strange responds to trivia questions while performing surgery.

See also
 List of number-one adult contemporary singles of 1978 (U.S.)

References

External links
 Single release info from discogs.com

1977 songs
1978 singles
1970s instrumentals
Chuck Mangione songs
Rock instrumentals
A&M Records singles